The Territorial Prelature of Alto Xingu-Tucumã  is a Roman Catholic territorial prelature located in the city of Tucumã in the Ecclesiastical province of Santarém in Brazil.

History
On November 6, 2019, the Territorial Prelature of Itaituba was established from the territory of Territorial Prelature of Xingu and Diocese of Marabá. Pope Francis appointed Jesús María López Mauléon, O.A.R., as its first bishop.

Leadership
 Prelates of Alto Xingu-Tucumã (Roman rite)
 Bishop Jesús María López Mauléon, O.A.R. (November 6, 2019 – present)

References

External links
 GCatholic.org
 Catholic Hierarchy

Roman Catholic dioceses in Brazil
Christian organizations established in 2019
Roman Catholic dioceses and prelatures established in the 21st century
Territorial prelatures